Vivan Mariner "Squee" Allen (September 9, 1916 — August 15, 1995) was a Canadian ice hockey right winger who played for several teams over a 12-year career. Allen played 11 games for the New York Americans of the National Hockey League during the 1940–41 season. He spent the rest of his career, which lasted from 1936 to 1950, in the minor leagues. Allan's brother, George, also played in the NHL. He was born in Bayfield, New Brunswick, but grew up in Kerrobert, Saskatchewan.

Career statistics

Regular season and playoffs

References
 

1916 births
1995 deaths
Canadian expatriates in the United States
Canadian ice hockey right wingers
Dallas Texans (USHL) players
Ice hockey people from Saskatchewan
New York Americans players
Philadelphia Falcons players
Pittsburgh Hornets players
Springfield Indians players
Washington Lions players